The Academic Crisis is the name given to a Portuguese governmental policy instigated in 1962 by the Estado Novo entailing the boycott and closure of several student associations and organizations, including the National Secretariat of Portuguese Students. Most members of this organization were opposition militants, among them many communists. The political activists who were anti-Salazar used to be investigated and persecuted by PIDE-DGS, the secret police, and according to the gravity of the offence, were usually sent to jail or transferred from one university to another in order to destabilize oppositionist networks and its hierarchical organization.

The students responded with demonstrations that culminated on March 24 with a huge student demonstration in Lisbon that was vigorously suppressed by the riot police, which led to hundreds of student injuries. Immediately thereafter, the students began a strike. These events were what became known as the Academic Crisis of 1962.

Marcelo Caetano, distinguished member of the Second Portuguese Republic and a reputed professor at the University of Lisbon Law School, was the 9th Rector of the University of Lisbon from 1959 on, but the Academic Crisis of 1962 led him to resign after protesting students clashed with riot police in the university's campus. Caetano would be appointed the successor of António de Oliveira Salazar, the mentor and leader of Estado Novo, in 1968.

However, between 1945 and 1974, there were three generations of militants of the radical right at the University of Coimbra and other universities, guided by a revolutionary nationalism partly influenced by the political sub-culture of European neofascism. The core of these radical students' struggle lay in a stalwart defence of the Portuguese Empire.

After the Carnation Revolution of 1974, 24 March would become the National Day of the Students.

References

Education in Portugal
1962 in Portugal
Protests in Portugal
Student protests in Europe
Estado Novo (Portugal)